Qaleh Jiq (also Romanized as Qal‘eh Jīq; also known as Qal‘eh Jīq-e Moḩammad Āleq) is a village in Gorganbuy Rural District, in the Central District of Aqqala County, Golestan Province, Iran. At the 2006 census, its population was 1,249, in 253 families.

References 

Populated places in Aqqala County